The New Caledonia national under-23 football team is the national U-23 team of New Caledonia and is controlled by the New Caledonian Football Federation.

History

Competition record

OFC
The OFC Men's Olympic Qualifying Tournament is a tournament held once every four years to decide the only qualification spot for Oceania Football Confederation (OFC) and representatives at the Olympic Games.

Current squad

The following where called up for the 2017 Pacific Mini Games.
Caps and goals as of 17 June 2015.

References

External links
 New Caledonian Football Federation official website

under-23
Oceanian national under-23 association football teams